Austropeltum is a genus of lichenized fungi in the family Sphaerophoraceae. The genus is monotypic, containing the single species Austropeltum glareosum, found in Australia and New Zealand.

Conservation status 
In November 2018 the New Zealand Department of Conservation classified Austropeltum glareosum as "Nationally Vulnerable" with the qualifiers "Data Poor" and "Threatened Overseas" under the New Zealand Threat Classification System.

References

Lecanorales
Lichen genera
Monotypic Lecanorales genera
Taxa named by Gintaras Kantvilas
Taxa named by Aino Henssen
Taxa described in 1992